The 1944 World Professional Basketball Tournament was the 6th edition of the World Professional Basketball Tournament. It was held in Chicago, Illinois, during the days of 20–24 March 1944 and featured 14 teams. It was won by the Fort Wayne Zollner Pistons who defeated the Brooklyn Eagles 50–33 in the championship game. The Harlem Globetrotters came in third after beating the New York Rens 37–29 in the third-place game. Bobby McDermott of Fort Wayne was named the tournaments Most Valuable Player.

Results

First round
20 March - Dayton Aviators 52, Akron Collegians 38
20 March - Brooklyn Eagles 55, Camp Campbell Tankmen 41
20 March - New York Rens 39, Detroit Suffrins 33
21 March - Cleveland Chase Brassmen 55, Indianapolis Pure Oils 52
21 March - Oshkosh All-Stars 51, Rochester Wings 40
21 March - Harlem Globetrotters 41, Pittsburgh Corbetts 40

Quarter-finals
22 March - Fort Wayne Zollner Pistons 59, Dayton Aviators 34
22 March - New York Rens 62, Cleveland Chase Brassmen 38
22 March - Brooklyn Eagles 49, Sheboygan Redskins 43
22 March - Harlem Globetrotters 41, Oshkosh All-Stars 311

Semi-finals

Third place game

Championship game

Individual awards

All-Tournament First team
F - Sonny Wood, New York Rens 
F - Mel Riebe, Cleveland Allmen Transfers
C - Blackie Towery, Fort Wayne Zollner Pistons
G - Mickey Rottner, Brooklyn Eagles
G - Bobby McDermott, Fort Wayne Zollner Pistons (MVP)

All-Tournament Second team
F - Jerry Bush, Fort Wayne Zollner Pistons 
F - Bob Tough, Brooklyn Eagles
C - Bernie Price, Harlem Globetrotters
G - Jack Garfinkel, Brooklyn Eagles
G - Manny Hyatt, Pittsburgh Corbetts

Notable occurrences
On 21 March, with three minutes remaining in the quarter-finals match between the Harlem Globetrotters and the Oshkosh All-Stars, a fight broke out between the players which needed officials and police to restore order. Thirty seconds after play resumed, trouble broke out again and Oshkosh coach Lon Darling decided to call his team from the game.
On 23 March, Bob Tough of the Brooklyn Eagles set a tournament record with his 32 points against Harlem Globetrotters in the semi-finals.

References

External links
WPBT 1939-48 on apbr.org

World Professional Basketball Tournament